The Gambling Research Center (Universität Hohenheim) examines the various aspects of gaming and gambling through an interdisciplinary scientific approach. The goal of the Center is to systematically and scientifically examine the wide range of topics relating to gaming and gambling such as lotteries, sports betting, card games and gaming machines.

History
The Gambling Research Center was founded at the Universität Hohenheim in 2004 with Prof. Dr. Tilman Becker acting as its head. Scientists whose main interests concern games of chance may join the scientific management board of the research center. At present, more than 20 professors from various disciplines and universities are members of the scientific management board. They bring their expertise from various fields of knowledge, such as consumer behavior, mathematics and statistics, finance, law, economic theory, communication and information science, household and gender economics, marketing, game theory, econometrics as well as psychology and medicine.

Goals
The Gambling Research Center aims at scientifically examining all topics relating to gaming and gambling from an interdisciplinary, in particular economic, mathematic, social, medical, psychological, and legal point of view.
Practice has shown that the individual disciplines come to different results as long as they do not relate their research findings. Such conflicting assessments are being examined in the Gambling Research Center.

Symposiums
Every year, representatives from academia and business gather to discuss current trends in, and aspects of the topic of gambling and gaming. The legal and regulatory aspects play just as large a role as addiction prevention and the economic impacts of gambling. About 200 representatives from all fields, including psychology and medicine, participate in the one- to two-day conference at the Universität Hohenheim.

Need for further research
The interdisciplinary Gambling Research Center suggests for further research in the following areas (state, June 2011):

Regulation
 political-economic analysis of the gambling market
 Regulation of the gambling market 
 Effects of regulatory measures on the gaming behavior
 Social benefits and costs of regulatory measures
 Link between the availability of gambling and a problematic or pathologic gaming behavior
 Tasks and rights of gambling commissions in other European countries
 Tasks and rights of a created German gambling Commission
Prevalence
 Frequency of gambling in kids’ or teenagers’ age and age- or gender-specific features
 Analysis of the internet offer of gambling  
 Online or “terrestrial” – Who plays where and when?
 Encumbrance of problematic/pathologic players
 Gambling and criminal acts among teenagers and adults
 Gambling and money laundering
Prevention and therapy
 Preventions measures and its evidence-basing
 Reasons for gambling participation for players with and without problematic gaming behavior
 Substitution and complementarity-relationship between forms of gambling
 Relationship of pathologic players to money
 Readiness to take risk of pathologic players
 Cognitive errors and pathologic gaming behavior
 Definition and research of the risk groups (considering immigrant background, gender aspects,…)
Economics
 Taxation of Gambling
 Fraud-, manipulation-, crime-risk potential of single gambling offers
 Suppliers of Internet gambling: specialists and Full-Liner
 Competitor conditions on the gambling market
 Mergers and Acquisitions on the gambling market
 Analysis of consumption of gambling

Presentations
 "Recent Developments in German Gambling Law", Vortrag auf der Tagung „Gambling Regulation in Europe“ der Universitäten Leuven und Tilburg, Leuven, 10. November 2009
 "The Future of Lotteries: Prediction Markets", Vortrag auf der 7th European Conference on Gambling Studies and Policy Issues der European Association for the Study of Gambling, Nova Gorica, Slowenien, 2. July 2008

Publication Series
 An Ecological Approach to Electronic Gambling Machines and Socioeconomic Deprivation in Germany
Xouridas, S., Jasny, J., Becker, T, in: Journal of Gambling Issues
 Glücksspiel im Internet: Beiträge zum Symposium 2009 der Forschungsstelle Glücksspiel. Schriftenreihe zur Glücksspielforschung Band 6; Becker T. (Hrsg.); Peter Lang Verlag, Frankfurt am Main 2011
 Werbung für Produkte mit einem Suchtgefährdungspotential: Tabak-, Alkohol- und Glücksspielwerbung aus rechtlicher, ökonomischer und psychologischer Sicht. Schriftenreihe zur Glücksspielforschung Band 5; Becker T., Peter Lang Verlag, Frankfurt am Main 2010
 Glücksspielsucht in Deutschland – Prävalenz bei verschiedenen Glücksspielformen. Schriftenreihe zur Glücksspielforschung Band 4; Becker, T. (Hrsg.); Peter Lang Verlag, Frankfurt am Main 2009
 Der Staatsvertrag zum Glücksspielwesen und dessen Umsetzung: Beiträge zum Symposium 2007 und 2008 der Forschungsstelle Glücksspiel. Schriftenreihe zur Glücksspielforschung Band 3; Becker, T. (Hrsg.); Peter Lang Verlag, Frankfurt am Main 2009
 Glücksspiel im Umbruch: Beiträge zum Symposium 2006 der Forschungsstelle Glücksspiel. Schriftenreihe zur Glücksspielforschung Band 2; Becker, T., Baumann, C. (Hrsg.); Peter Lang Verlag, Frankfurt am Main 2007
 Gesellschafts- und Glücksspiel: Staatliche Regulierung und Suchtprävention. Schriftenreihe zur Glücksspielforschung Band 1; Becker, T., Baumann, C. (Hrsg.); Peter Lang Verlag, Frankfurt am Main 2006

Series
Series for gambling research (each appeared in Peter Lang Verlag, Frankfurt am Main)

 Zwischenevaluierung des Glücksspielstaatsvertrags: Beiträge zu den Symposien 2014 und 2015 der Forschungsstelle Glücksspiel. Band 16; Becker, T. (Hrsg.); 2016
 Verfügbarkeit und Sucht beim Automatenspiel. Band 15; Becker, T.; 2015
 Verhinderung von Sportwettmanipulationen und Autonomie des Sports. Schriftenreihe zur Glücksspielforschung Band 14; Weinbuch, C.; Peter Lang Verlag, Frankfurt am Main 2015
 Sucht-, Betrugs- und Kriminalitätsgefährdungspotential von Glücksspielen: Beiträge zum Symposium 2013 der Forschungsstelle Glücksspiel. Band 13; Becker, T. (Hrsg.); 2015
 Der neue Glücksspielstaatsvertrag: Beiträge zum Symposium 2012 der Forschungsstelle Glücksspiel. Band 12; Becker, T. (Hrsg.); 2014
 Abbruch der Zahlungsströme als Mittel zur Bekämpfung unerlaubter Internetglücksspiele. Band 11; Brugger, C.; 2013
 Neueste Entwicklungen zum Glücksspielstaatsvertrag: Beiträge zum Symposium 2011 der Forschungsstelle Glücksspiel. Band 10; Becker, T. (Hrsg.); 2012
 Jugendliche und glücksspielbezogene Probleme - Risikobedingungen, Entwicklungsmodelle und Implikationen für präventive Handlungsstrategien. Band 9; Hayer, T.; 2012
 Zwischenbilanz zum Glücksspielstaatsvertrag für Lotterien und Sportwetten: Beiträge zum Symposium 2010 der Forschungsstelle Glücksspiel. Band 8; Becker, T. (Hrsg.); 2011
 Soziale Kosten des Glücksspiels in Deutschland. Band 7; Becker, T.; 2011
 Glücksspiel im Internet: Beiträge zum Symposium 2009 der Forschungsstelle Glücksspiel. Band 6; Becker T. (Hrsg.); 2011
 Werbung für Produkte mit einem Suchtgefährdungspotential: Tabak-, Alkohol- und Glücksspielwerbung aus rechtlicher, ökonomischer und psychologischer Sicht. Band 5; Becker T., 2010
 Glücksspielsucht in Deutschland - Prävalenz bei verschiedenen Glücksspielformen. Band 4; Becker, T. (Hrsg.); 2009
 Der Staatsvertrag zum Glücksspielwesen und dessen Umsetzung: Beiträge zum Symposium 2007 und 2008 der Forschungsstelle Glücksspiel. Band 3; Becker, T. (Hrsg.); 2009
 Glücksspiel im Umbruch: Beiträge zum Symposium 2006 der Forschungsstelle Glücksspiel. Band 2; Becker, T., Baumann, C. (Hrsg.); 2007
Gesellschafts- und Glücksspiel: Staatliche Regulierung und Suchtprävention. Band 1; Becker, T., Baumann, C. (Hrsg.); 2006

References

Gambling and society